Abdullah Awaji is a Saudi football player who plays as a midfielder, most recently for Sajer.

External links 
 

Living people
1994 births
Saudi Arabian footballers
Al-Faisaly FC players
Al-Watani Club players
Al-Mujazzal Club players
Al-Riyadh SC players
Sajer Club players
Place of birth missing (living people)
Saudi Professional League players
Saudi First Division League players
Saudi Second Division players
Association football midfielders